Khatian Road railway station is located on Khatian Road Hyderabad district of Sindh province of the Pakistan.

See also
 List of railway stations in Pakistan
 Pakistan Railways

References

External links

Railway stations in Hyderabad District, Pakistan